Decision at Midnight is a 1963 American-British drama film directed by Lewis Allen and starring Martin Landau, Nora Swinburne and Walter Fitzgerald. It is also known by the alternative title of Music at Midnight.

Plot
Adaptation of the play 'Music at Midnight', of an Iron Curtain country revolutionary leader who is inspired to talk over things with the dictator after the revolt has failed and come to a mutual arrangement. (BFI synopsis.)

Cast
 Martin Landau as Nils  
 Nora Swinburne as Margaret  
 Walter Fitzgerald as Prime Minister  
 Torin Thatcher as Southstream  
 Esmond Knight as Peter Hauser  
 John Forrest as Stephen  
 Oscar Beregi Jr. as Chief Marshal  
 David Janti as Kurtz  
 Charles Cameron as Ambassador  
 Violet Rensing as Lena  
 Rudolph Anders as Uncle  
 Hilary Wontner as Forbes  
 Donald Simpson as Head waiter 
 William Pawley Jr. as Reporter

References

Bibliography
 Goble, Alan. The Complete Index to Literary Sources in Film. Walter de Gruyter, 1999.

External links

1963 films
American drama films
British drama films
1963 drama films
Films directed by Lewis Allen
1960s English-language films
1960s American films
1960s British films